Sam Feder is an American filmmaker.

Early life and education
Feder was born and raised in Brooklyn, New York. In 2004, he received an MA degree in media studies from the New School, New York. In 2013, he received an MFA degree from the Integrated Media Arts graduate program at Hunter College, New York.

Films
Feder's films include the 2006 feature Boy I Am, and the 2013 film Kate Bornstein is a Queer & Pleasant Danger.

Feder was given a James Aronson Award for Social Justice Journalism in 2015 for the film Kate Bornstein is a Queer & Pleasant Danger.

Feder's film Disclosure: Trans Lives on Screen premiered at the 2020 Sundance film festival and was released on Netflix the same year. The film explores the representation of trans people in contemporary film. The New York Times reviewed the film positively, calling it "a sweeping examination of how transgender people have been depicted in film and TV, from the silent era to The Arsenio Hall Show to Pose.

See also
 List of transgender film and television directors

References 

The New School alumni
Film directors from New York City